The term "Intelligent Enterprise" refers to a management approach that applies technology and new service paradigms to the challenge of improving business performance. The concept, as articulated in James Brian Quinn's seminal book Intelligent Enterprise (Free Press, 1992) posits that intellect is the core resource in producing and delivering services. The book describes the management approach and computing infrastructure needed to harness that intellect effectively. This approach is referred to in business jargon as Knowledge Management, of which Quinn was an important proponent. Quinn was the William and Josephine Buchanan Professor of Management at the Amos Tuck School at Dartmouth College.

About Author
James Brian Quinn, a 1949 Yale graduate with an MBA from Harvard and a PhD from Columbia University began teaching in Dartmouth’s Tuck Business School in 1957 till his retirement in 1993 (Hall, 2012). His expertise laid in the field of strategic planning, entrepreneurial innovation and management of technological change. At the time between his successes, he received fellowships that included Ford Foundation (1963-4), the Alfred. P. Sloan Foundation (1967–68), and the Fulbright Exchange program (1973). Quinn published extensively on educational books on both corporate and national policy – which included his theory of Intelligent Enterprise - an expansion of Knowledge Management (Academy of Management, 2012).

History - Research
In 1983, Quinn began his research on Intelligent Enterprise during his preparation for a conference on "Technology and Economics" (Quinn 1992). When severely researching Quinn exposed his interest in the role of technology in service – and believed it was the key to advancement in infrastructure and manufacture. With the help of Penny Paquette and Ms Patricia Higgins, Quinn began data studies and interviews – mainly involving careers of advanced technology users in major service industries. Quinn found that there was a definite connection between technology and business and highlighted these results in journals including Scientific American, Harvard Business Review and Sloan Management Review (Academy of Management, 2014).

From there, the book ‘Intelligent Enterprise’ was written – integrating service economy with innumerable technology. Profoundly explaining the use of technology in enterprise and that of which manages work not only within an enterprise but also between enterprises. However, in order for technologic enterprise to be successful the intelligence of strategic processes acted out by human services is required.

Quinn highlights that in advanced industrial countries, the importance of technology in the service industry or manufacturing one will be the key to prosperity and productivity. He supposes that the organisation of enterprises depends more on intellectual resources rather than management of physical assets.

The Paradigm
This paradigm highlights that in today’s world, highly intelligent systems is the key to expanding industry, however, in order to do so - the organisational set up is required. These knowledge based services and technology are revolutionising the economy. Organisational set up includes "autonomous problem solving, intelligently seeking solutions and taking whatever action is required" (Thannhuber, 2004).

Quinn continues to highlight the way in which managers should approach running their businesses. This includes a rewarding work environment, low friction and energising within the company (Quinn, 1992). By outsourcing the less core functions to superior vendors, firms will become more centralised in core components (Wiig 2000). However, the degree to which the intelligent enterprise can be successful depends on the "competencies of the people and its operational capabilities" (Yingzhao, Dexiong)  such as, structure, policies and systems. In order to achieve exceptional success, the combination of utilising intelligence and competitive information of the environment is essential.

Real Life Examples

Honda
Once Honda began, it competed with companies such as Toyota and other Japanese producers – however, outsourcing many of its components to achieve high economies of scale and solely focusing on the development and production of its manufacturing operations made it successful – in addition to developing an organised leadership team (Quinn 1999).

Apple
Apple when introduced to the highly competitive computer environment retailed for about $2000 but cost less than $500, as over 70% of its components were outsourced (Choo 1995). Instead, Apple focused on the design, logistics, software and product assembly. Due to the concentration of only a few knowledge adding services, Apple was able to rise to the top of the highly competitive PC market and attain great sales (Gupta, Sharma 2004).

Advantages of Intelligent Enterprises
Gupta states that more available information will lead to better decision-making and thus, would be beneficial in a macro economic sense (Gupta, Sharma 2004). In the 1990s, the implementation of new technologies created this churn of high productivity level – thus, helping the macro economy as it enables faster growth and lower inflation. In turn, faster economic growth leads to higher real wages and a decrease in unemployment.

As well as benefiting the macro economic goals, it also has a great impact within the industry. Due to easier access to information, it helps industries view their demand and supply between productions. Therefore, a reduction in product volatility and tighter inventory levels are usually expected.

Gupta separates the advantages of Intelligent Enterprises into 3 different levels: Operations, Tactical and Strategies (Gupta, Sharma 2004).

Operations:  In an operative view, intelligent enterprises sets the platform in which automates processes and allows the access to all data information which may have been physically and logically dispersed at one time.

Tactical: Tactically, it helps in making better decision-making as information is easily accessed and can also reduce the length in which they are made.

Strategies: The reduction of operating times promotes the reduction of operating costs thus leading to better customer services. In addition, advanced business decision-making follows to better tactical strategies.

Limitations of Intelligent Enterprises
However, as with all business theories, there are limitations. Palmer, a Ph. D student, has found that corporations and businesses are blinded at the fact that in order for intelligent enterprises to work it is both the inner and outer of businesses, which need to work hand in hand. The inner of a business includes the following: strategic planning from the management, resource efficiency, opportunities, processes and interaction with the environment (Palmer 2007)  On the other hand, the latter would include those such as the general economy – economic pressures, corporation’s mergers and takeovers – in hand, have an effect internally.

It is important to note that humans are the intelligence behind the technological systems and to affirm the validity is still very limited. Human beings have many qualities that are different to that of a technology apparatus (psychological and sociological), which needs to be taken into account. Therefore, limiting this theory to that of a technological approach should not be the sole focus of a corporation (Palmer 2007).

References

External links
 Intelligent Enterprise consultants website
 Intelligent Enterprise software Engineers website

Management systems